The 2011–12 Leicester City F.C. season was the club's 107th season in the English football league system and their 60th (non-consecutive) season in the second tier of English football. This was their third consecutive season in the Football League Championship.

The summer saw Leicester spend big in an attempt to gain promotion back to the Premier League, but an inconsistent start saw manager Sven-Göran Eriksson sacked after a 3–0 defeat at home to struggling Millwall saw Leicester sitting in 13th position after 13 games.

After days of negotiations, Nigel Pearson was finally re-appointed as manager on 15 November 2011, starting his second spell at the club after leaving for Hull City 17 months earlier. However, the club continued their inconsistent form under Pearson and sat mid-table for virtually the entire season before eventually finishing in 9th place.

Pre-season

Pre-season events
Note: This section does not include close season transfers or pre-season match results, which are listed in their own sections below.
18 May 2011 – Asia Football Investments led by Vichai and Aiyawatt Raksriaksorn acquire a 100% stake in the club's ownership.
7 June 2011 – Susan Whelan named as club chief executive. Simon Capper named as new finance director and Andrew Neville named as football director.
5 July 2011 – Leicester's home ground The Walkers' Stadium is renamed The King Power Stadium due to a change in sponsorship.
5 July 2011 – First team coach Dietmar Hamann leaves the club to become manager of Stockport County.
5 August 2011 – Aleksandar Tunchev signs a one-year contract extension which ends in 2012.

Kit and sponsorship
On 6 May 2011 a preview of the 2011–12 home kit was released on the official Leicester City website. It was announced that the kit would be worn against Ipswich Town in the last game of the 2010–11 season. On 7 May 2011 the home kit was revealed to have a collar for the first time since the 2001–2002 season with white shorts and blue socks with a white trim.

Friendlies

Events
Note:This section does not include transfers or match results, which are listed in their own sections below.
21 September 2011 – Sol Bamba signs a new contract until 2014.
7 October 2011 – Tom Hopper signs a professional contract until 2013.
24 October 2011 – Sven-Göran Eriksson and Derek Fazackerley left their posts as Manager and Assistant Manager by mutual agreement.
24 October 2011 – Mike Stowell and Jon Rudkin are placed in temporary charge of first team affairs as joint caretaker managers.
15 November 2011 – Nigel Pearson is re-appointed manager, 17 months after leaving the club. Craig Shakespeare and Steve Walsh are also re-appointed as his assistants.
10 January 2012 – Cian Bolger signs new deal until June 2013.
12 January 2012 – Chris Short leaves his post as fitness coach.
19 January 2012 – Liam Moore signs a contract extension which ends in 2013.
19 January 2012 – Shane Byrne signs a contract extension which ends in 2013.
25 February 2012 – Matt Mills is stripped of the captaincy.
29 February 2012 – Jeffrey Schlupp signs a new contract until 2015.
1 March 2012 – Bruno Berner announces his retirement from professional football.

Players and staff

2011–12 squad

2011–12 backroom staff

Transfers

In

Out

Loans in

Loans out

Released

Results

Football League Championship

FA Cup

Football League Cup

Awards

Club awards
At the end of the season, Leicester's annual award ceremony, including categories voted for by the players and backroom staff, the supporters and the supporters club, saw the following players recognised for their achievements for the club throughout the 2011–12 season.

Divisional awards

Championship statistics

Championship table

Club standings

Results by round

Scores by club
Leicester City score given first.

Club statistics
All data from LCFC.com

Appearances
 
 
 
 

|}

Top scorers

Most assists

Disciplinary record

Captains

Suspensions

Penalties

Overall seasonal record
Note: Games which are level after extra-time and are decided by a penalty shoot-out are listed as draws.

References

2011-12
2011–12 Football League Championship by team